Dasà is a comune (municipality) in the Province of Vibo Valentia in the Italian region Calabria, located about  southwest of Catanzaro and about  southeast of Vibo Valentia.

Geography
Dasà borders the following municipalities: Acquaro, Arena, Dinami, Gerocarne.

Demographics

References

External links

 Official website 

Cities and towns in Calabria